Bulgarian National Women's Union was a state women's organization in Communist Bulgaria, founded in 1945. It was a state organization and a branch of the Communist Party. 

Its purpose was to mobilise women in the political ideology of the state, as well as to enforce the party's policy within gender roles and women's rights. It played an important role in the life of women in the state during its existence.

References

 Marilyn Rueschemeyer: Women in the Politics of Postcommunist Eastern Europe
 Henry Philip David, Joanna Skilogianis, Anastasia Posadskaya-Vanderbeck: From Abortion to Contraception: A Resource to Public Policies and 

Social history of Bulgaria
Women's organizations based in Bulgaria
People's Republic of Bulgaria
History of women in Bulgaria
Feminist organizations in Europe
Political organizations
Organizations established in 1945
1950 disestablishments